Italo Zingarelli (15 January 1930 – 29 April 2000) was an Italian film producer. He produced 26 films between 1954 and 1995. In 1981, he was a member of the jury at the 31st Berlin International Film Festival.

Selected filmography 
 The Invincible Gladiator (1961)
 Gladiators 7 (1962)
 The Young Wolves (1968)
 The Five Man Army (1969)
 They Call Me Trinity (1970)

References

External links 
 
 Italo Zingarelli's bio at Rocca delle Macie

1930 births
2000 deaths
Italian film producers
People from Lugo, Emilia-Romagna